State of the Culture is an American late-night talk show created by Joe Budden and Sean Combs, that premiered on September 10, 2018 on Revolt. The show is hosted by Joe Budden and Remy Ma and co-hosted by Brandon "Jinx" Jenkins and Eboni K. Williams, and formerly co-hosted by Scottie Beam.

Premise
State of the Culture "will find hip-hop's most talked about pundit", Joe Budden, "delivering his signature raw, unfiltered, and informative debates and interviews where he digs deeps with prominent artists, celebrities, and personalities."

Production
On May 14, 2018, it was announced that Joe Budden had joined Revolt and was developing the new talk show.

On August 29, 2018, it was announced that the show would premiere on September 10, 2018. Episodes of the series will air each week on Monday though Revolt's online digital platforms and will then broadcast on television a day later every Tuesday on Revolt. The show is also shown on Revolt's YouTube channel.

Filming
The show is filmed in Jersey City, New Jersey at Parlay Studios.

References

External links
 State of the Culture on Revolt
 

2018 American television series debuts
2010s American late-night television series
2010s American variety television series
2020s American late-night television series
2020s American variety television series
English-language television shows
Television shows filmed in New Jersey